The 2006 Black Reel Awards, which annually recognize and celebrate the achievements of black people in feature, independent and television films, took place in Washington, D.C. on February 18, 2006. Lackawanna Blues swept the awards with six wins, whilst in the film nominations Crash and Hustle & Flow each took home three awards.

Winners and nominees
Winners are listed first and highlighted in bold.

References

2006 in American cinema
2006 awards in the United States
Black Reel Awards
2005 film awards